The Beardmore 120 hp was a British six-cylinder, water-cooled aero engine that first ran in 1914, it was built by William Beardmore and Company as a licensed-built version of the Austro-Daimler 6. The engine featured cast iron cylinders and mild steel concave pistons. Produced between August 1914 and December 1918, the design powered many World War I aircraft types.

Applications
Airco DH.1
Airco DH.3
Armstrong Whitworth F.K.3
Armstrong Whitworth F.K.8
Bristol T.T.A.
Cody V
Martinsyde Elephant
Royal Aircraft Factory F.E.2
Royal Aircraft Factory R.E.5
Royal Aircraft Factory R.E.7
Vickers F.B.14
White and Thompson No. 3

Specifications (120 hp)

See also

References

Notes

Bibliography

 Gunston, Bill. World Encyclopaedia of Aero Engines. Cambridge, England. Patrick Stephens Limited, 1989. 
 Lumsden, Alec. British Piston Engines and their Aircraft. Marlborough, Wiltshire: Airlife Publishing, 2003. .

External links

1910s aircraft piston engines
120